Sar Asiab-e Pain (also Romanized as Sar Āsīāb-e Pā’īn; also known as Sar Āsīāb-e Soflá) is a village in Javid-e Mahuri Rural District, in the Central District of Mamasani County, Fars Province, Iran. At the 2006 census, its population was 25, in 6 families.

References 

Populated places in Mamasani County